Yonatan Haile (born 15 September 1994) is an Eritrean cyclist riding for .

Major results
2015
 4th National Road Race Championships
2016
 1st Stage 1 Tour of Eritrea
 2nd Massawa Circuit
 5th Overall Tour du Faso
2017
 5th Road race, African Road Championships
 8th Massawa Circuit
 10th Fenkil Northern Red Sea Challenge
2018
 6th National Road Race Championships

References

1994 births
Living people
Eritrean male cyclists
Sportspeople from Asmara
21st-century Eritrean people